Paul Piaget (born 1905, date of death unknown) was a Swiss rowing coxswain who competed in the 1920 Summer Olympics. In 1920, he won the bronze medal of the Swiss boat in the coxed pair event.

References

External links
 profile

1905 births
Year of death missing
Swiss male rowers
Coxswains (rowing)
Olympic bronze medalists for Switzerland
Olympic rowers of Switzerland
Rowers at the 1920 Summer Olympics
Olympic medalists in rowing
Medalists at the 1920 Summer Olympics
European Rowing Championships medalists
20th-century Swiss people